Kosovo has participated in the Turkvision Song Contest twice since its debut in . The Kosovan broadcaster, Radio Television of Kosovo (RTK), has been the organiser of the Kosovan entry since its debut in the contest.  In 2013, Kosovo's first entry at Turkvision, Ergin Karahasan which belongs to the Turkish minority in Kosovo, qualified to the grand final were the finished in 12th place with a score of 151 points.  Kosovo withdrew from the 2014 contest because the country is not recognised by Russia, therefore entrance would have been denied. Instead, Albania entered the contest. Kosovo and Raška region (Sandžak) participated in this competition for Serbia.

History
Kosovo made their debut in the Turkvision Song Contest at the  contest, in Eskişehir, Turkey. An updated participation list was published on 10 September 2014, of which Kosovo did not appear as participating, although it is unknown as to why they do not show on the list.

Participation overview

See also 
 Kosovo in the Eurovision Song Contest

References 

Turkvision
Countries in the Turkvision Song Contest